Saint Christopher Monastery (meaning the Monastery of Saint Christopher), is a restored Armenian church of the 7th century, located in a cemetery  southeast of the outskirts of Dashtadem village and Dashtadem Fortress in the Aragatsotn Province of Armenia. Adjacent to the church (north) is a 13th-century stone rectangular tower (bell/defensive/funerary) with sloped walls. It has small windows on the upper portion of the wall, but no access to the interior. The surrounding cemetery has been in use from the 6th century to modern times, and contains several interesting khachkars. A low-stone wall surrounds the complex and a section of the old cemetery. Dashtadem Fortress may be seen in the distance from the monastery.

Architecture

Surb Nshan Church 
The Church of Surp Nshan is constructed of orange and gray tuff stone. Some of the stones on the southern and western exterior façades bear inscriptions in Armenian. A single compound dome is centered above the main body of the church, with an octagonal façade around the drum and dome. Light penetrates the interior of the structure via four small windows positioned around the drum, and two slightly larger windows above the entry and the semi-circular apse to the east. A portal to the west serves as the only entrance to the interior. Low-relief pairs of decorative columns stand at either side of the exterior of the entry, supporting a semi-circular arched lintel.  The lintel has dentil ornamentation lining its outer edge. The interior of the church is unadorned and reminiscent of Kamsarakan S. Astvatsatsin Church found in the nearby village of Talin, within the Talin Cathedral complex.

Gallery

References

Bibliography

External links 

 Armeniapedia:Kristapori Vank Church

7th-century churches in Armenia
Christian monasteries in Armenia
Tourist attractions in Aragatsotn Province
Churches in Aragatsotn Province